(October 11, 1971 – November 4, 2005) was a drummer for Japanese alternative rock bands Shonen Knife and DMBQ. She died in a car accident in 2005.

Biography

Life and career
Nishiura was born in Hiroshima, Japan. She was a well-known session drummer, and played with other bands during her career including Rashinban, Droop, Jesus Fever, ya to i, jimama, Teem, Music Start Against Young Assault and Cel. She  joined Japanese alternative rock band Shonen Knife in 2001 and played with them until 2004.

Death
On November 4, 2005, Nishiura was touring the United States with her band DMBQ. Their van was involved in a highway accident near the Delaware Memorial Bridge of Carneys Point Township, Salem County, New Jersey. At the junction between US 40 and I-295, another vehicle crossed lanes and struck the van from behind, which then went down an embankment and rolled over. Nishiura was ejected from the vehicle and pronounced dead at the scene. The other members of DMBQ were hospitalised and the accident also severely injured the band's manager, although they all survived.

References

External links 
 China-Mana official site
 DMBQ official site
 Shonen Knife 2003 tour photos
 Punknews

2005 deaths
Japanese rock drummers
Japanese alternative rock musicians
Shonen Knife members
Japanese punk rock musicians
Road incident deaths in New Jersey
1971 births
20th-century Japanese musicians
20th-century drummers
Women in punk